The meridian 122° west of Greenwich is a line of longitude that extends from the North Pole across the Arctic Ocean, North America, the Pacific Ocean, the Southern Ocean, and Antarctica to the South Pole.

122°W is the Seventh Meridian of the Dominion Land Survey in Canada.

The 122nd meridian west forms a great circle with the 58th meridian east.

From Pole to Pole
Starting at the North Pole and heading south to the South Pole, the 122nd meridian west passes through:

{| class="wikitable plainrowheaders"
! scope="col" width="130" | Co-ordinates
! scope="col" | Country, territory or sea
! scope="col" | Notes
|-
| style="background:#b0e0e6;" | 
! scope="row" style="background:#b0e0e6;" | Arctic Ocean
| style="background:#b0e0e6;" |
|-
| 
! scope="row" | 
| Northwest Territories — Prince Patrick Island
|-
| style="background:#b0e0e6;" | 
! scope="row" style="background:#b0e0e6;" | M'Clure Strait
| style="background:#b0e0e6;" |
|-
| 
! scope="row" | 
| Northwest Territories — Banks Island
|-
| style="background:#b0e0e6;" | 
! scope="row" style="background:#b0e0e6;" | Amundsen Gulf
| style="background:#b0e0e6;" |
|-valign="top"
| 
! scope="row" | 
|-valign="top"
| 
! scope="row" | 
|-
| style="background:#b0e0e6;" | 
! scope="row" style="background:#b0e0e6;" | Pacific Ocean
| style="background:#b0e0e6;" |
|-
| style="background:#b0e0e6;" | 
! scope="row" style="background:#b0e0e6;" | Southern Ocean
| style="background:#b0e0e6;" |
|-
| 
! scope="row" | Antarctica
| Unclaimed territory
|}

See also

121st meridian west
123rd meridian west

References 

w122 meridian west